Scutogyrus is a genus of flatworms belonging to the family Ancyrocephalidae.

The species of this genus are found in Central America.

Species 
List based on GBIF

Scutogyrus bailloni 
Scutogyrus chikhii 
Scutogyrus ecoutini 
Scutogyrus gravivaginus 
Scutogyrus longicornis 
Scutogyrus minus 
Scutogyrus vanhovei

Transcriptome 
The transcriptome of Scutogyrus longicornis has been studied in 2022, and G-Protein-Coupled-Receptors (GPCRs) were described in detail in this species, together with those of another monogenean, the diplectanid Rhabdosynochus viridisi. These were the first two transcriptomes released for monogeneans of the subclass Monopisthocotylea.

References

Platyhelminthes